"The Ballad of the Lonesome Cowboy" is a song written and composed by Randy Newman, and performed by Chris Stapleton, for the soundtrack of the Disney/Pixar feature film Toy Story 4. The song was released as a single on June 5, 2019, and was met with a positive reception from critics.

Background and composition
Randy Newman, known for his work as composer and songwriter on the Toy Story films, was confirmed to be returning for Toy Story 4. "The Ballad of the Lonesome Cowboy", the film's main single, written by Newman and performed by Chris Stapleton, was revealed and released on June 5, 2019. The song is performed through the perspective of Sheriff Woody, the film's main character, because, according to Newman, "[Woody] feels like he was a lonesome cowboy until someone comes along and changes his world." Newman was particularly pleased by the fact that Stapleton performs the song, while Stapleton felt that "[i]t's a tremendous honor to get to sing a Randy Newman song in what is without question one of the most iconic animated franchises in history.

Music video
On June 5, 2019, a lyric video of the song was released. On June 26, 2019, a YouTube channel called FANIMATOR released another music video of the song. In this version, FANIMATOR played scenes from the first three Toy Story films and arranged them to fit the song. The scenes were picked to represent the themes of loneliness and friendship.

Other versions
Randy Newman performed a version for the soundtrack of Toy Story 4.

Reception
Rania Aniftos of Billboard praised the song's melody as "catchy". Nick Evans of CinemaBlend positively compared the song to Newman's previous songs from the Toy Story films, writing: "In keeping with the tradition of Toy Story songs, Randy Newman’s “The Ballad of the Lonesome Cowboy” is equal parts tear-jerking and heartwarming". Similarly, Ming Lee Newcomb of Consequences of Music compared the song to Newman's "You've Got a Friend in Me" from the original film, writing that "the charming Western ballad is similarly feel-good and kid-friendly". Angela Stefano of The Boot wrote that "[n]ot only is Pixar making childhood dreams come true with the release of a new Toy Story movie, they're making country music dreams come true, too" praising Newman's lyrics as "heartfelt yet childlike" and Stapleton's singing as "instantly recognizable".

References

Songs from Toy Story
Chris Stapleton songs
2010s ballads
2019 singles
2019 songs
American songs
Walt Disney Records singles
Songs written by Randy Newman
Songs about cowboys and cowgirls
Songs about loneliness